The 2002 Pacific Curling Championships were held from November 4 to 10 in Queenstown, New Zealand.

South Korea's Lee Dong-keun won the men's event over Australia's Hugh Millikin (it was the first Pacific title for the South Korean men's team). On the women's side, Japan's Shinobu Aota defeated South Korea's Kim Mi-yeon in the final (it was the tenth Pacific title for the Japanese women and the second title for skip Shinobu Aota).

By virtue of winning, the South Korean men's team and the Japanese women's team qualified for the 2003 World  and  Curling Championships in Winnipeg, Canada.

Men

Teams

Round robin

 Teams to playoffs

Playoffs

Semifinals

Bronze medal game

Final

Final standings

Women

Teams

Round robin

 Teams to playoffs

Playoffs

{{2TeamBracket | RD1=Bronze medal
| RD1-seed1=
| RD1-team1=''
| RD1-score1=11| RD1-seed2=
| RD1-team2=
| RD1-score2=4
}}SemifinalsBronze medal gameFinal'''

Final standings

References

Pacific Curling Championships, 2002
Pacific-Asia Curling Championships
International curling competitions hosted by New Zealand
2002 in New Zealand sport
Sport in Otago
November 2002 sports events in New Zealand